Hippolyte Morestin (1 September 1869 – 12 February 1919) was a French surgeon, and associate professor of anatomy at the University of Paris. He was one of the founders of cosmetic surgery. He was dubbed "The Father of the Mouths" after his breakthroughs in  oral and maxillofacial surgery.

Morestin was born at Basse-Pointe, a commune in the French overseas department of Martinique. His father Charles Amédée Morestin (d. 1902) was a prominent doctor who influenced both Hippolyte and his younger brother Amédée to study medicine. Both Hippolyte and Amédée dedicated their doctoral theses, defended in Paris in 1894 and 1912, respectively, to their father, and the work of Amédée used observations by Hippolyte.

Morestin greatly influenced the British-New Zealand surgeon Harold Gillies, who met him on leave in Paris during the First World War. Gillies was attached to the British General Hospital in Rouen. Morestin, when Gillies was observing him, removed a tumor from a patient's face, and essentially "grafted" skin by cutting and rolling it from the patient's jaw onto the wound to allow the skin to regrow.

Morestin died from a pulmonary illness during the influenza epidemic of 1918–1919.

Works
From 1892 and until his death in 1919 Morestin has published more than 600 scientific works including the following

Chirurgie générale des articulations, Paris: Doin (1907)

References

1869 births
1919 deaths
Deaths from the Spanish flu pandemic in France
People from Basse-Pointe
French surgeons